Birgit Clarius (born 18 March 1965 in Gießen) is a retired German heptathlete, best known for her bronze medal at the 1993 World Indoor Championships. Her personal best was 6500 points.

Achievements

External links

1965 births
Living people
German heptathletes
Athletes (track and field) at the 1992 Summer Olympics
Olympic athletes of Germany
Universiade medalists in athletics (track and field)
Universiade gold medalists for Germany
Medalists at the 1991 Summer Universiade
Sportspeople from Giessen